Stephen James "Stevie" Morrison (born 25 November 1978, in Eastbourne) is a successful British yachtsman who has enjoyed success in a classes from the International Cadet to the 49er. He is the son of Phil Morrison, the British yacht designer.

Education
Morrison was educated at The Beacon Church of England Primary School, a voluntary aided state primary school in the port city of Exmouth in Devon, followed by Exeter School, a co-educational independent school in the city of Exeter (also in Devon), in South West England.

Life and career
Together with teammate Ben Rhodes, Morrison became the 2007 World Champion in the 49er dinghy. In 2008 they won the silver medal in the same event, behind the Australians Nathan Outteridge and Ben Austin, while in 2006 they won the bronze medal. That same year Morrison won the European 49er title.

Other sailing results

Other achievements
2005 – Medemblik, Holland Regatta,  1st, 49er
2006 – Hyères, Semaine Olympique Française,  2nd, 49er
2007 – Miami, Rolex Miami OCR, 2nd, 49er
2007 – Medemblik, Breitling Regatta, 3rd, 49er

References

External links
 
 
 
 
 

1978 births
Living people
British male sailors (sport)
Sailors at the 2008 Summer Olympics – 49er
Sailors at the 2012 Summer Olympics – 49er
Olympic sailors of Great Britain
Extreme Sailing Series sailors
49er class world champions
World champions in sailing for Great Britain